Raymond Nicholas "Ray" Syrnyk, (1934 – December 9, 1956) was a professional Canadian football player, and was one of 62 people who died on Trans-Canada Air Lines Flight 810.

Syrnyk played professionally for the  Saskatchewan Roughriders as a rookie offensive lineman at the time of his death.  Syrnyk's No. 56 jersey is one of eight that has been retired by the Roughriders.

Amateur football and college career 
Syrnyk played amateur Canadian football in the Canadian Junior Football League, and was a member of the 1953 Canadian Junior Football Championship Saskatoon Hilltops.

He was enrolled as a student at the University of Saskatchewan in Saskatoon at the time of his death.

Professional career 
Following junior league football, Syrnyk signed with the Saskatchewan Roughriders in 1956.   He was on his way back to Regina on Flight 810 after watching teammates Mel Becket and Gordon Sturtridge play in the 1956 All-Star Game in Vancouver, British Columbia, on December 8, 1956.

Death 
Syrnyk, along with Roughriders teammates, Becket, Sturtridge, and Mario DeMarco, were passengers on Flight 810 with another pro football player, Calvin Jones, of the Winnipeg Blue Bombers.  All five players were at the 1956 All-Star Game in Vancouver, and were headed back to their respective teams' home cities.  The five players were accompanied by 54 other passengers and 3 crew members who all lost their lives in Western Canada's worst aviation disaster on December 9, 1956. The crash is the subject of the 2012 documentary The Crash, part of TSN's Engraved on a Nation series of eight documentaries celebrating the 100th Grey Cup.

References

1934 births
1956 deaths
Accidental deaths in British Columbia
Canadian football offensive linemen
Players of Canadian football from Saskatchewan
Saskatchewan Roughriders players
Sportspeople from Saskatoon
University of Saskatchewan alumni
Victims of aviation accidents or incidents in Canada
Victims of aviation accidents or incidents in 1956